Austin Daniel Coleman (born 1983) is an American professional BMX rider and reality television personality, the co-host (along with his partner Raisa Kuddus), on the HGTV series First Home Fix.

Personal life 
Austin Coleman was born in Los Angeles, CA to Freddie and Jeanette Coleman.  Austin was involved in sports as a child and began skateboarding at the age of 10 until he got his older brother's BMX bike.

Although his first year as a professional came senior year of high school, an avid student, Austin continued his academic and professional athletic careers simultaneously attending the University of Southern California on Academic Scholarship and graduating May 2006, with a degree in Urban Planning and Development.

In 2021, Austin co-hosts Fresh Starter, where he and his partner Raisa Kuddus help create custom renovations using only what their young clients have to offer—awkward spaces and tight budgets.

Style 
Coleman is known for having his own unique flair, either dropping completely unique variations or tweaking tricks in ways only he's been able to master. Not surprisingly, he strives for diversity in his riding, which has led him into several different disciplines throughout his riding career, the most recent being Vert. He brings his signature style to the halfpipe, floating downside whips so big it seems impossible that he'll make it back to the pedals in time.

Competitions
X Games Asia 2010 Vert Bronze Medalist 
X Games Asia 2010 Mini Mega Bronze Medalist 
T-Mobile Extreme Playgrounds 2010 Bronze Medal 
Dew Tour 2008 Park Bronze Medalist 
Action Sports World Tour 2008 Silver Medalist

References

External links 
 

1983 births
Living people
Participants in American reality television series
Cyclists from Los Angeles
Sportspeople from Miami
BMX riders